CaixaBank, S.A., formerly Criteria CaixaCorp, is a Spanish multinational financial services company. CaixaBank is based in Valencia, with operative offices in Madrid and Barcelona, Spain. It is Spain's third-largest lender by market value, after Banco Santander and BBVA. CaixaBank has 5,397 branches to serve its 15.8 million customers, and has the most extensive branch network in the Spanish market. It is listed in the Bolsa de Madrid and is part of the IBEX 35.

The company consists of the universal banking and insurance activities of the La Caixa group, along with the group's stakes in the oil and gas firm Repsol, the telecommunications company Telefónica and its holdings in several other financial institutions.

History

The firm was formed in 2007 as Criteria CaixaCorp, a publicly traded vehicle for La Caixa's shareholdings and investments in both industrial and financial services companies. At the time of its 2007 debut, the Criteria CaixaCorp initial public offering was the largest-ever in Spain. The company was promoted to the IBEX 35 index in January 2008.

A 2011 restructuring of the companies of the group saw Criteria renamed CaixaBank as La Caixa's banking and insurance activities were merged into it.  At the same time most of the industrial stakes held by Criteria (including Grupo Port Aventura, Grupo Agbar, Gas Natural and Abertis) were transferred out of the firm to the new entity Criteria CaixaHolding, 100% owned by La Caixa. CaixaBank retained stakes in Repsol YPF and Telefónica as well as all of its holdings in other financial services companies.

On 26 March 2012 CaixaBank announced its intention to merge with Banca Cívica, valuing Civica at €977 million. The merger was completed in the 3rd quarter of the year and created the largest bank in Spain.

On 27 November 2012, CaixaBank announced its plan to buy nationalized bank Banco de Valencia after Spain's bank restructuring fund called FROB injects €4.5 billion into Banco de Valencia. The FROB also assumed losses of up to 72.5% for a period of ten years in certain assets held by Banco de Valencia.

On 26 September 2013, CaixaBank approved the sale of its real estate unit Servihabitat to a joint venture between the bank and private equity fund Texas Pacific Group (TPG) for an initial price of €310 million. CaixaBank's parent company, financial group La Caixa, said it estimated it would bring in €317 million in capital gains from the deal.

In June 2014 CaixaBank's Board of Directors appointed Gonzalo Gortázar as their new CEO, having approved the resignation by mutual consent of Juan María Nin as Deputy Chairman and CEO. In his first interview since becoming CEO, Gonzalo Gortázar stated "There are a number of priorities for CaixaBank. The first one is dealing with the last legs of the crisis. We want to normalize the balance sheet and we want to normalize funding costs."

On 6 October 2017, the bank announced its decision to move its legal headquarters to Valencia as a response to political uncertainty in Catalonia. A few days later the bank decided to also move its fiscal domicile to Valencia.

On 4 September 2020, it was confirmed that CaixaBank and Bankia are negotiating for a potential merger. The merger would create the biggest domestic bank in Spain with a worth of €650 billion.

2008–2013 Spanish financial crisis 

The Fund for Orderly Bank Restructuring (FROB), a banking bailout and reconstruction program initiated by the Spanish government in June 2009, facilitated the merger between CaixaBank and Banco de Valencia on 27 November 2012.

With competitors such as Banco Santander SA with 4,752 Spanish branches, CaixaBank announced it is conducting a "gradual process" of adjusting its branch networks on 9 January 2013.

CaixaBank SA sold 13.1 billion pesos of shares in Grupo Financiero Inbursa SAB to both bolster trading in the Mexican lender controlled by billionaire Carlos Slim and replenish money lost amid Spain's property crash.

Investment portfolio (at 27 July 2019)

See also

List of banks in Spain

References

External links
 

 
Companies based in Barcelona
Banks of Spain
IBEX 35
Banks established in 2011
Companies listed on the Madrid Stock Exchange
Spanish brands
Spanish companies established in 2011
Banks under direct supervision of the European Central Bank
Companies based in Valencia